Raymond Ethan Goldstein (born 1961) FRS FInstP is Schlumberger Professor of Complex Physical Systems in the Department of Applied Mathematics and Theoretical Physics (DAMTP) at the University of Cambridge and a Fellow of Churchill College, Cambridge.

Education
Goldstein was educated at the West Orange Public Schools and Massachusetts Institute of Technology (MIT) where he graduated Phi Beta Kappa with double major Bachelor of Science degrees in Physics and Chemistry in 1983. He continued his education at Cornell University where he was awarded a Master of Science degree in Physics in 1986, followed by a PhD in 1988 for research on phase transitions and critical phenomena supervised by Neil Ashcroft.

Research
Goldstein's research focuses on understanding nonequilibrium phenomena in the natural world, with particular emphasis on biophysics and has been funded by the Engineering and Physical Sciences Research Council (EPSRC), the Biotechnology and Biological Sciences Research Council (BBSRC) and the European Union 7th Framework Programme on Research & Innovation (FP7). His research has been published in leading peer reviewed scientific journals including Proceedings of the National Academy of Sciences of the United States of America, Physical Review Letters, and the Journal of Fluid Mechanics.

Career
Goldstein has held academic appointments at the University of Chicago, Princeton University and the University of Arizona. He was appointed Schlumberger Professor at the University of Cambridge in 2006.

Awards and honours
Goldstein was awarded the Stefanos Pnevmatikos International Award in 2000. He was elected Fellow of the American Physical Society in 2002, Fellow of the Institute of Physics (FInstP) in 2009 and the Institute of Mathematics and its Applications (FIMA) in 2010. With Joseph Keller, Patrick B. Warren and Robin C. Ball, Goldstein was awarded an Ig Nobel Prize in 2012 for calculating the forces that shape and move ponytail hair.

Goldstein was elected a Fellow of the Royal Society (FRS) in 2013. His nomination reads: 

He was awarded the 2016 Batchelor Prize of the International Union of Theoretical and Applied Mechanics for his research into active matter fluid mechanics., and the Institute of Physics Rosalind Franklin Medal and Prize for revealing the physical basis for fluid motion in and around active cells.

Personal life
Goldstein married Argentine mathematical physicist Adriana Pesci.

References

1961 births
Living people
People from West Orange, New Jersey
Cornell University alumni
Massachusetts Institute of Technology School of Science alumni
American biophysicists
Academics of the University of Cambridge
Fellows of the Royal Society
Fellows of the Institute of Physics
Fellows of the American Physical Society